Magdalena Samozwaniec née Kossak (Krakow, 26 July 1894  – 20 October 1972, Warsaw) was a Polish writer. The Kossak family is known for many artists including her father Wojciech Kossak, her brother Jerzy and sister Maria.

Stories by Magdalena Samozwaniec 
Na ustach grzechu: powieść z życia wyższych sfer towarzyskich, Kraków 1922
Czy chcesz być dowcipny? Straszliwe opowieści „na wesoło”, Warszawa 1923
Malowana żona, Warszawa 1924
Kartki z pamiętnika młodej mężatki, Warszawa 1926
Starość musi się wyszumieć, Warszawa 1926
Mężowie i mężczyźni, Warszawa 1926
O kobiecie, która znalazła kochanka: powieść osnuta na tle najbliższej, nieokreślonej bliżej przyszłości. Rzecz dzieje się w Krakowie, Warszawa 1930
Wielki szlem: powieść tylko dla brydżystów, Warszawa 1933
O dowcipnym mężu dobrej Ludwiki: powieść, Warszawa 1933
Ponura materialistka: nowele, Poznań 1934
Świadome ojcostwo, Warszawa 1936
Maleńkie karo karmiła mi żona, Warszawa 1937
Wróg kobiet, Warszawa 1938
Piękna pani i brzydki pan, Warszawa 1939
Królewna Śmieszka, Kraków 1942
Fraszki Magdaleny Samozwaniec. Wiek XX, Kraków 1944
Tylko dla kobiet, Katowice, 1946
Błękitna krew, Kraków 1954
Moja wojna trzydziestoletnia, Warszawa 1954
Maria i Magdalena, Kraków 1956
Tylko dla mężczyzn, Katowice 1958
Młodość nie radość: powieść satyryczna, Warszawa 1960
Czy pani mieszka sama? Katowice 1960
Pod siódmym niebem, Warszawa 1960
Tylko dla dzieci: wiersze i bajki satyryczne dla młodszych i starszych, Kraków 1960
Komu dziecko, komu? Powieść satyryczno-obyczajowa, Warszawa 1963
Tylko dla dziewcząt, Warszawa 1966
Szczypta soli, szczypta bliźnich, Warszawa 1968
Krystyna i chłopy, Warszawa 1969
Zalotnica niebieska, Warszawa 1973
Łyżka za cholewą, a widelec na stole: mała kulinarna silva rerum, Kraków 1974
Angielska choroba, Warszawa 1983
Baśnie, Warszawa 1987
Z pamiętnika niemłodej już mężatki, Warszawa 2009

References 
  Rafał Podraza, Wspomnienia o Magdalenie Samozwaniec, Instytut Wydawniczy PIW 

1894 births
1972 deaths
Writers from Kraków
People from the Kingdom of Galicia and Lodomeria
Polish women writers